Sengunthar, also known as the Kaikolar and Senguntha Mudaliyar is a Tamil caste commonly found in the Indian state of Tamil Nadu and also in some other parts of South India and the neighboring country Sri Lanka. They were traditional weavers by occupation and warriors by ancient heritage. They were part of the Chola army. Majority of Sengunthars are sub-divided into numerous clans based on a patrilineal lineage known as Koottam or Gotra.

Etymology
The ancient occupational name of Kaikkolar comes from the words kai (hand) and kol (a shuttle used in looms). The appended -ar means people. Kaikkolar also means men with stronger arms.

Sengunthar means red spear people, which has the community’s connection to the Lord Murugan, who is known as a red god. Legend has it that there were nine commanders called Navaveerargal in Murugan’s army and Sengunthar descended from them.

In ancient times they were also called as Kaarugar (weaver), Thanthuvayar (weaver), Senguntha padaiyar (soldiers), Senaithalaivar (army commander) and Kaikolar (Weaver).

Sengunthars were given the title Mudaliar for their bravery. The twelfth century poet Ottakoothar’s Itti Elupatu, a panegyric on the bravery and prowess of arms of Kaikkola warriors, says they were known as Mudaliars during the Later Chola period.

Mudali means first, suggesting that the title bearer is of the first-ranked among people. They had also used the title Nayanar after their names.

History

Origin
Shiva was enraged against the giants who harassed the people of the earth and sent forth six sparks of fire from his eyes. His wife, Parvati, was frightened, and retired to her chamber and in so doing, dropped nine beads from her anklets. Siva converted the beads into as many females, to each of whom was born a hero. These nine heroes (Navaveerargal), namely Virabahu, Virakesari, Viramahendrar, Viramaheshwar, Virapurandharar, Viraraakkathar, Viramaarthandar, Viraraanthakar and Veerathirar with Subrahmanya at their head, marched in command of a large force, and destroyed the demons. Sengunthar claim to be the descendants of these warriors. After killing the demon, the warriors were told by Siva that they adopt a profession, which would not involve the destruction or injury of any living creature and weaving being such a profession, they were trained in it. Chithira valli, daughter of Virabahu, one of the above commanders was married to King Musukuntha Cholan . The descendants of Navaveerargal and Musukunthan were claimed as first generation of Sengunthars.

Chola period
The earliest literary evidence about Sengunthar occurs in Adhi Diwakaram, a Tamil lexicon written by Sendan Diwakarar. This dictionary, probably from the 8th century CE, is thought to refer to them as weavers and army commanders, which may be indicative of their dual role in society at that time.

Inscriptions from the 11th century suggest that by the time of the Chola dynasty, the Sengunthar had already developed its involvement in weaving and trading, together with a role in military matters that was probably necessary to protect those interests. They were a part of the Ayyavole 500 trading group during the Chola period and there are also references in the 12th century that suggest they had armies and that some specific people were assigned to act as bodyguards for the Chola emperors. Such historical records emphasise their military function, with the poet Ottakoothar glorifying them and suggesting that their origins lay with the armies of the gods.

They were militarized during the medieval Chola period, when some of them held the title Brahmadaraya or Brahmamarayan, which was usually reserved for high-ranking Brahmin officials in the Chola government. They had also used the title 'Chola gangan' from the evidence "kaikolaril kali avinasi yaana ellam valla chola gangan" ,which was only used by the royal families of the chola dynasty.

Some were chieftains and commanders-in-chief of the later Cholas. Kaikkolar commanders-in-chief were known as Samanta Senapathigal or Senaithalaivar.

According to Vijaya Ramaswamy, in early thirteenth century large number of Kaikolars were migrated to Kongu Nadu from Tondaimandalam.

Vijayanagara period
After the 13th century, Sengunthars became associated with weaving completely.
According to Deepak Kumar, the Sengunthar weavers very often figure in the capacity of kudi, i.e. tenant-cultivators and also holders of kaniyachi, that is hereditary possession over the land. During the period of Sadasiva Raya of Vijayanagara empire, the sthanathar of the Brahmapuriswara temple made an agreement that they would cultivate certain lands of the Kaikkolar regiment.

According to Himanshu Prabha Ray, in 1418 in Tiruvannamalai temple, Sengunthars were given the right to blow the conch, ride palanquins and elephants and wave the temple fly whisk. In 16th century some of the Kaikolars were migrated to Kerala region from Tamil region.

Traditions and festivals
Among Sengunthar Both alcoholic and sexual abstinence are valued, as is control of the passions. But when they are concerned with the sacred locus of the interior, meat eating, blood sacrifice, spirit possession, and the worship of small gods are all prominent. Senaithalaivar thus follow both a priestly model and a Tamil tradition. The Kaikola Teesikar or Desigar who were non-Brahmin priest at temples of Murugan. Sengunthar community practices both the vegetarian and non-vegetarian traditions.

Each family (kulam) of the Sengunthar had their own Kula Deivam (deity). Sengunthars share Murugan as a common deity and additionally have any one of several other deities, such as Angalamman or Ambayamman.

The Sura Samharam festival is a traditional ritual where the Sengunthars dress as the lieutenants of Karthikeya and re-enact the killing of the demon Suran.

In the flag hoisting ceremony at Sri Lanka Nallur Kandaswamy temple, the Sengunthar families who were military heroes in old Jaffna Kingdom have rights to bring out the temple flag and carry the flag as the ceremony of Sura Samharam battle. The houses of Sengunthars are beautifully decorated curtains with the picture of rooster, the legendary vehicle of Lord Muruga hang in their houses, in the day of the flag ceremony.

Tamil nadu
The thisai  were Sivapuram (Walajabad) to the east, Thonthipuram to the south, Virinjipuram to the west, Chozhasingapuram (Sholinghur) to the north.

The head of 72 nadu was Kancheepuram nadu which was called as Mahanadu by the Sengunthars. The head officer of Mahanadu were called as Aandavar and Aandavar is highest authority leader for Sengunthars.
The head officer of the each nadu council were called as Naattaanmaikarar or Periyadhanakarar or Pattakarar.

Subgroups
There are some divisions among a section of the caste based on their traditions.

Siru Thaali Kaikolar
Siru thaali Kaikolar, also known as Saami katti Kaikolars, are characterized by a lingam tied to their arm, a custom now defunct. Women of this section worn small size of the Thali or Mangala sutra, due to which they are called so. This section allow widows to wear colored saris as other women. They are mainly found in the Eeruurunaadu( Erode, Salem and Namakkal districts ).

Perun Thaali Kaikolar or Kongu Kaikolar
Perun thaali Kaikolar (பெருதாலிகட்டி கைகோளர் முதலியார்கள்), also known as Kongu Kaikolar and 'Vellai seelai kaikkolar'. Women of this section wore big size of the Thali. Widows belonging this section wore white or saris like other Kongu castes hence the name 'Vellai seelai Kaikolar'. They are mainly found vastly in Coimbatore District and the Bhavani River Belt of Erode district. Being the aboriginal weavers of the Kongu region unlike later immigrants, they are properly called 'Kongu Kaikkolvar'

Rattukaara Kaikolar
Rattukaarar, also known as Rendukaarar because they weave with warps composed
of double threads and they are traditional carpet makers. Other reason is said to be their sacrifice of first born's heads for weaving a skirt for their caste poet Ottakoothar. They are mainly found in West region of Tamil Nadu.

Thalaikooda Mudaliyar
They are called Thalaikooda Mudaliyar( meaning "head refusers"), because it is said that in 12th century they refused to sacrifice the heads of their first sons to the caste poet, Ottakoothar to compose poem so they were outcast in that time. Talaikooda Mudaliar are originally from Koorainaadu, in Tanjore district of Chola country. Now they are found in Pondicherry region. Also called 'Thattaya Nattar' from their sub-region of the Kongu region.

Maduraiyar 
Kaikolars of the Pandya country who wear the Meenakshi Sundareswarar thali like other Pandya country native castes.

Kaikolar originally of the Pandya country who wear the thali (marriage badge) of Meenakshi Sundareshwarar like other Pandya country native castes.

Kulagurus 
The Kongu section has Adi Saiva kulagurus in common with other Kongu castes while the last three sub castes have the Irayamangalam Math, the descendant of Paranjothi Nayanar as their guru,   

a general of the Pallavas. His seat is at Irayamangalam by the Kaveri in the Namakkal District.

Sengunthars from 20th century
Sengunthars are classified and listed as a Backward Class by the governments of both Tamil Nadu and India.

Literary references
Senguntha Prabanda Thiratu is a collection of various literary works written about Kaikkolars. It was originally published by Vannakkalanjiyam Kanji Shri Naagalinga Munivar in 1926 and republished in 1993 by Sabapathi Mudaliar. The collection contains:
Senkunthar Pillai Tamizh by Gnanaprakasa Swamigal, Tirisirapuram Kovintha Pillai and Lakkumanaswami. A collection of songs about the Sungunthars, taken from palm-leaf manuscripts, that was first published in the 18th century in Kanchipuram
Eetti Ezhubathu, the major literary work about the Sengunthars. It comprises poetry by Ottakkoothar written in the 12th century CE during the reign of Rajaraja Chola II. It describes the mythical origin of Sengunthar, expeditions of Sengunthar chieftains and also praises the 1008 Kaikolar who were beheaded trying to enable it to be written.
Ezhupezhubathu, a sequel to Eetti Ezhubathu written by Ottakkoothar. In this work, he prays the goddess Saraswathi to reattach the heads of the 1008 Sengunthars to their respective bodies.
Kalipporubathu, a collection of ten stanzas compiled by Kulothunga Chola III. These stanzas were written after Ezhupezhubathu to express joy when the 1008 heads were reattached. These stanzas include the songs who witnessed it in the court of Raja Raja II including himself which was later compiled by his successor Kulothunga Chozha III
Thirukkai Vazhakkam, which describes the good deeds of Sengunthars and their Saivite religious principles. It was written by Puhalendi.
Sengunthar Silaakkiyar Malai was written by Kanchi Virabadhra Desigar. It describes the legends and eminent personalities of the Sengunthar community.

Notable people

See also
Adaviyar
Padmashali
Tanti
Kaikalas
Salagama
Pattusali

Notes

References

Further reading

Indian castes
Social groups of Tamil Nadu
Weaving communities of South Asia